US Post Office-Scarsdale is a historic post office building located at Scarsdale in Westchester County, New York, United States. It was built in 1937 and designed by consulting architects Schultze and Weaver for the Office of the Supervising Architect.  It is a symmetrically massed red brick building containing limestone trim in the Classical Revival style.  It is composed of a two-story central section with flanking one story wings.  The front facade features a three-bay recessed limestone portico supported by a pair of tall slender Doric order columns.  The lobby features two murals by Gordon Samstag titled "Law and Order in Old Scarsdale" and "Caleb Heathcote Buys the Richbell Farm."

It was listed on the National Register of Historic Places in 1989.

See also
National Register of Historic Places listings in southern Westchester County, New York

References

Scarsdale
Government buildings completed in 1937
Neoclassical architecture in New York (state)
Buildings and structures in Westchester County, New York
National Register of Historic Places in Westchester County, New York
Scarsdale, New York